The Gang That Couldn't Shoot Straight is a 1969 novel by Jimmy Breslin. It is a roman à clef based on the life of Joey Gallo.

It was adapted into the 1971 film of the same name, directed by James Goldstone.

References

External links
 

1969 American novels
American crime novels
American novels adapted into films
Novels about Italian-American organized crime
Roman à clef novels
Viking Press books